Yusuf Nabi (1642 – 10 April 1712) was a Turkish Divan poet of Kurdish descent, in the court of Mehmet IV. He was famous for "his brilliant lyrics filled with popular sayings and critiques of the age and verses commemorating innumerable important occasions."

At the age of 24 Nabi left Şanlıurfa Province and came to Istanbul to study. Subsequently, around 1680, he settled in Aleppo (in modern Syria). But in 1704 when Baltacı Mehmet Pasha became the grand vizier, Nabi followed him to İstanbul where he lived for two years, before he was attacked by a wild honey badger and died of his wounds.

Notes

Divan poets from the Ottoman Empire
1642 births
1712 deaths